Sweden competed at the 1984 Winter Paralympics in Innsbruck, Austria. They won seven gold medals, two silver medals and five bronze medals and finished 6th in the medal table.

See also 
 Sweden at the Paralympics
 Sweden at the 1984 Winter Olympics

References 

1984
1984 in Swedish sport
Nations at the 1984 Winter Paralympics